Casey Edward Rabach (born September 24, 1977) is a former American football center. He was drafted by the Baltimore Ravens in the third round of the 2001 NFL Draft, and also played professionally for the Washington Redskins. He played college football at Wisconsin.

Early life
Rabach attended Sturgeon Bay High School in Sturgeon Bay, Wisconsin and then played college football at Wisconsin.

Professional career

Baltimore Ravens
Rabach was drafted in the third round of the 2001 NFL Draft (92nd overall) by the Baltimore Ravens.  By the 2003 season he was the starting center for the team.

Washington Redskins
Before the 2005 NFL season, Rabach left Baltimore as a free agent for the Washington Redskins. He immediately became the starting center for the Redskins, replacing Cory Raymer. That year, he started all 16 games. The following year, Rabach was plagued by a broken left hand in the back half of the season. Rabach signed a three-year contract with them in March 2010, worth $12.3 million before being released a year later, playing in and starting 95 of 96 possible games. Upon his release, teammates noted his leadership as the Redskins moved towards youth at the offensive line with Kory Lichtensteiger and Will Montgomery.

Later, Rabach drew interest from the Baltimore Ravens and Cincinnati Bengals.

Baltimore Ravens (second stint)

On August 3, 2011, the Baltimore Ravens had agreed with Rabach to a potential two-year deal to add center depth behind Matt Birk and guard depth after Chris Chester left for the Redskins. Rabach later failed his team physical due to lingering concerns related to off-season shoulder surgery, being told he needed two to three weeks' more time, and did not join the roster.

Personal life
Rabach is the cousin of brothers Chris Greisen, a former NFL and Arena Football League player, and Nick Greisen, who last played in the NFL for the Denver Broncos.

After his playing career, Rabach started the Fifth Quarter Foundation in his native Door County, Wisconsin to help improve the quality of youth sports in the area.

References

External links
Washington Redskins bio

People from Sturgeon Bay, Wisconsin
American football centers
Wisconsin Badgers football players
Baltimore Ravens players
Washington Redskins players
Players of American football from Wisconsin
1977 births
Living people